Variations on "America" is a composition for organ by the American composer Charles Ives.

Composition
Composed in 1891 when Ives was seventeen, it is an arrangement of a traditional tune, known as "America (My Country, 'Tis of Thee)" (words by Samuel Francis Smith), and was at the time the de facto anthem of the United States. The tune is also widely recognised in Thomas Arne's orchestration as the British National Anthem, "God Save the King", and in the former anthems of Russia ("The Prayer of Russians", from 1816 to 1833), Switzerland ("Rufst du, mein Vaterland", until 1961), and Germany ("Heil dir im Siegerkranz", from 1871 to 1918), as well as being the current national anthem of Liechtenstein ("Oben am jungen Rhein") and the royal anthem of Norway, "Kongesangen".

Ives prepared it for a Fourth of July celebration in 1892 at the Methodist church where he was organist in Brewster, New York. He performed it for the first time on February 17, 1892, and made revisions to the work until 1894. Although the piece is considered challenging even by modern concert organists, he spoke of playing the pedal work in the final variation as being "almost as much fun as playing baseball".

It went unpublished until 1949, when the organist E. Power Biggs rediscovered it, and prepared an edition for publication. He incorporated it into his repertoire, and it became a regularly performed piece by American organists. In 1962 it was orchestrated by William Schuman, and premiered in this version by the New York Philharmonic under Andre Kostelanetz in 1964. The Schuman orchestration formed the basis of a wind band version by William E. Rhoads, published in 1968.

Structure
Introduction and Theme
Variation I
Variation II
Interlude I
Variation III
Variation IV
Interlude II
Variation V
Coda

The interludes are Ives's first notated use of bitonality: the first combines F major for the right hand and D-flat major for the left hand and pedals, whilst the second combines A-flat major and F major.

Ives' biographer Jan Swafford notes that whilst it might be tempting to hear Variations on "America" as a satire, the probability is that Ives meant the work as a sincere exercise in variations for organ. He adds that whilst Ives was capable of musical jokes, they are usually considerably broader than here. Ives was not deaf to its comic potential however: he later noted that his father "didn't let me do it much, as it made the boys laugh" in church.

Recordings
Recordings of Ives' original piece have been made by several organists, including E. Power Biggs (CBS) and Simon Preston (Argo). Recordings of Schuman's orchestration have included performances conducted by Eugene Ormandy, (CBS/Sony), Morton Gould (RCA), Arthur Fiedler (Decca) and José Serebrier (Naxos).

References

External links

1891 compositions
Compositions by Charles Ives
Compositions for organ
Compositions in F major
Polytonality
America